Nick Durandt  (December 26, 1963 –  April 21, 2017) was a South African boxing trainer and manager.

During his career Durandt produced 95 South African champions in all 17 weight divisions, 38 world champions and 27 International champions through the WBC, WBA, IBF, WBO, WBF and IBO organisations.
He was the son of Clifford Michael Durandt (16 April 1940 – 3 October 2002), a South African footballer who played in the English First Division for Wolverhampton Wanderers.

Durandt trained numerous fighters to world titles status including Thulani "Sugarboy" Malinga, three time South African and three time world champion, Phillip Ndou, Cassius Baloyi, Silence Mabuza, Isaac Hlatshwayo, Jacob Mofokeng, Jeffrey Mathebula, Malcolm Klassen, Siphiwe Nonqayi, Hawk Makepula, Zolani Tete and Moruti Mthalane.

References

Boxing trainers
South African sports coaches
1963 births
2017 deaths